The seventh season of La Voz Kids premiered on 27 May 2022 on Antena 3. This season, David Bisbal is the only returning coach from the previous season after the departure of three coaches, Rosario Flores, Vanesa Martín and Melendi. Pablo López who became coach in the regular version of the show was announced as the new coach. Meanwhile, they were joined by Sebastián Yatra, who became coach in La Voz Kids Colombia and the previous season's coach adviser Aitana. Eva González and Juanra Bonet remained as the host of the program.

Pol Calvo from Team Pablo was announced as the winner, marking Pablo López's first and only win as a coach on La Voz Kids. However, with Calvo's win, López became the only coach to win on all three versions of the show: La Voz, La Voz Senior, and La Voz Kids.

Coaches and Hosts 

In this season, there are changes in coach panel, only David Bisbal returned from previous season. Pablo López who became coach in the regular version of the show,  Sebastián Yatra who became coach in La Voz Kids Colombia and the previous season's coach adviser Aitana are announced as the new coach, replacing Rosario Flores, Vanesa Martín and Melendi.

Eva González and Juanra Bonet continuing their hosting on the program.

Teams 

  Winner
  Runner-up
  Third place
  Fourth place
  Eliminated in the Finale
  Eliminated in the Semi-final
  Eliminated in the Knockouts
  Stolen in the Battles
  Eliminated in the Battles

Blind Auditions 

Each coach needs to recruit 15 young artists into their teams. The blocks were raised to three per coach, contrary to two in the previous season. The blocked coach's chair won't turn around. Two coaches can be blocked in one audition.

Battles 
The battles round started on 2 July 2022. The coaches can steal two losing artists from other coaches(a rise from previous season's one steal). In addition, coaches' advisors help them on deciding who will be advancing to the next round; Luis Fonsi for Team David Bisbal, Evaluna Montaner for Team Aitana, Lola Índigo for Team Sebastian Yatra and Antonio Orozco for Team Pablo Lopez. Contestants who won their battle or were stolen by another coach advanced to the Knockouts.

Knockouts 
The knockouts round started on 9 July. Known as "El Asalto" in Spanish, in this round each teams' seven participants perform, the public decide one of each team to advance for the semi-final, and the coaches select only three to advance for the semi-final. The advisors from the battles continued to help the coaches in their choices.

Final phase

Week 1: Semi-final (16 July)

Week 2: Finale (22 July)

Round one

Round two

Elimination Chart

Overall 
Color key
Artist's info

Result details

References 

Spain
2022 Spanish television seasons
Spanish television series